Syedna Qasim-Khan Zainuddin was the 31st Dai of the Dawoodi Bohras (died on 23 Jumadil Akhir 1054/56 AH/August 25(?) 1646 AD in Ahmedabad, India). He succeeded the 30th Dai Syedna Ali Shamsuddin to the religious post.

Life
Syedna Zainuddin became Da'i al-Mutlaq in 1056 AH/1646 AD. His period of Dawat was 1042–1054 AH/1634–1646 AD. He served five of his predecessors.

Lineage
Syedna Qasim-Khan's ancestry is traced back to Maulaya Abdullah and Syedi Hasan Feer.

Burial
He is buried in Mazar-e-Qutbi in Ahmedabad.

References

Further reading
The Ismaili, their history and doctrine by Farhad Daftary(Chapter -Mustalian Ismailism-p. 300-310)

Ismaili da'is
Dawoodi Bohras
1646 deaths
Year of birth unknown
17th-century Ismailis
17th-century Islamic religious leaders